Gel (Good Experience Live) is a conference focused on the concept of a "good experience" in all contexts – business, art, society, technology, and life.

The conference has been held annually in New York City since 2003, and the first European counterpart, euroGel 2006, took place in Copenhagen, on 1 September 2006. Each conference has been hosted by Gel's founder, Mark Hurst. Past speakers have included Salman Khan, Gabriel Weinberg, and Bob Mankoff, and Rhett and Link.

References

External links
Gel's website

Conferences in the United States
International conferences
Recurring events established in 2003